Yamthong Haokip is an Indian politician and member of the Bhartiya Janata Party. Haokip was first elected as a member of the Manipur Legislative Assembly from Saikul constituency in Kangpokpi District from the Congress Party in 2012 and re-elected again with the same party ticket in 2017, but switched to the BJP for the 2022 elections.

History
 Elected MLA from 46 Saikul(ST) A/C, 10th Manipur Legislative Assembly 2012
 Elected MLA from 46 Saikul(ST) A/C, 11th Manipur Legislative Assembly 2017

References

Living people
Manipur politicians
Indian National Congress politicians from Manipur
Year of birth missing (living people)
Bharatiya Janata Party politicians from Manipur
Manipur MLAs 2012–2017
Manipur MLAs 2017–2022